Confuse the Marketplace is an EP by LCD Soundsystem.  The 12" single is a collection of songs for the North American market, all of which were previously only available on vinyl on European singles from Sound of Silver.  All the songs were readily available on the extended edition of 45:33, released one month prior.

Track listing

External links
Official LCD Soundsystem website

LCD Soundsystem albums
2007 EPs